Early Bloomer is a 2003 American computer-animated short film produced by Sony Pictures Imageworks.  It was created and directed by Kevin J. Johnson. It was the studio's second short film after The ChubbChubbs!.

Plot
The 3-minute film is following a tadpole who grows legs before the other tadpoles and is teased for it until the others unexpectedly grow legs too. He unexpectedly grows arms, which marks the end of the film.

Release
Early Bloomer was theatrically released on May 9, 2003 along with Daddy Day Care. On December 2, 2003, the short was also released as special feature on the Daddy Day Care DVD.

References

External links
 
 

2003 short films
2003 films
2003 animated films
2003 computer-animated films
Columbia Pictures short films
Columbia Pictures animated short films
Animated films about frogs
Films scored by Mark Mancina
Animated films without speech
2000s English-language films
2000s American films